Ptychohyla dendrophasma is a species of frog in the family Hylidae found in Guatemala and possibly Mexico. Its natural habitat is subtropical or tropical moist montane forests. It is threatened by habitat loss.

Sources

dendrophasma
Amphibians of Guatemala
Frogs of North America
Critically endangered fauna of North America
Amphibians described in 2000
Taxa named by Jonathan A. Campbell
Taxonomy articles created by Polbot